The inti was the currency of Peru between 1985 and 1991. Its ISO 4217 code was PEI and its abbreviation was I/. The inti was divided into 100 céntimos. The inti replaced the inflation-stricken sol. The new currency was named after Inti, the Inca sun god.

History
The inti was introduced on 1 February 1985, replacing the sol which had suffered from high inflation. One inti was equivalent to 1,000 soles. Coins denominated in the new unit were put into circulation from May 1985 and banknotes followed in June of that year.

By 1990, the inti had itself suffered from high inflation. As an interim measure, from January to July 1991, the "inti millón" (I/m.) was used as a unit of account. One inti millón was equal to 1,000,000 intis and hence to one new sol. The nuevo sol ("new sol") was adopted on 1 July 1991, replacing the inti at an exchange rate of a million to one. Thus: 1 new sol = 1,000,000 intis = 1,000,000,000 old soles.

Inti notes and coins are no longer legal tender in Peru, nor can they be exchanged for notes and coins denominated in the current nuevo sol.

Coins

Coins were introduced in 1985 in denominations of 1, 5, 10, 20, and 50 centimos (designs were taken from the previous 10, 50, 100, and 500 soles de oro coins), plus 1 and 5 intis. The 1 céntimo coin was issued only in 1985. The 5 céntimo coins were issued until 1986. All the other denominations were issued until 1988. All coins featured Navy Admiral Miguel Grau: cent coins on the reverse, Inti coins on the obverse.

Banknotes
In June 1985, notes were introduced in denominations of I/.10, I/.50 (taken from previous 10,000 and 50,000 soles de oro notes) and I/.100, followed by I/.500 in December of the same year. The next year, I/.1,000 notes were added, followed by I/.5,000 and I/.10,000 in 1988. 50,000 and I/.100,000 notes were added in 1989. I/.500,000 denominations were added early in 1990, I/.1,000,000 denominations were added in mid-1990, and I/.5,000,000 intis in August 1990. The obverses featured:

I/.10 - Ricardo Palma, writer
I/.50 - Nicolás de Piérola, President, finance minister
I/.100 - Ramón Castilla, President, Army Marshal
I/.500 - Túpac Amaru II, revolutionary leader
I/.1,000 - Andrés Avelino Cáceres, President, Army Marshal
I/.5,000 - Miguel Grau, Navy admiral
I/.10,000 - César Vallejo, writer
I/.50,000 - Víctor Raúl Haya de la Torre, politician
I/.100,000 - Francisco Bolognesi, Army colonel
I/.500,000 - Ricardo Palma, writer
I/.1,000,000 - Hipólito Unanue, medical doctor, nationalist
I/.5,000,000 - Antonio Raimondi, scientist

See also
 Economy of Peru

External links
Peru Banknotes: full detailed catalog

Modern obsolete currencies
Inti
Economic history of Peru
1985 establishments in Peru
1991 disestablishments in Peru
Currency symbols